The Sauratown Mountains, which are sometimes called "the mountains away from the mountains", are an isolated mountain range located within Stokes and Surry counties in the U.S. state of North Carolina. The vast majority of the range is located in Stokes County. Although the range occupies only 5% of Stokes County's area, it dominates the county's scenery from almost every direction. The Sauras rise sharply 800 to 1,700 feet (244 to 518 meters) above the surrounding terrain. 

The Sauratown Mountains were named after the "Saura", a Siouan-speaking Native American tribe that lived in the area before European settlers arrived in the early 18th century.  The range consists of rugged, heavily forested ridges frequently broken by large quartzite rock cliffs that can be seen for miles. The Sauratown Mountains are known for offering some of the best rock climbing in North Carolina. The highest point in the Sauratown Mountains is Moore's Knob, which rises to 2,579 feet (786 m).

The range is home to Hanging Rock State Park, which was formed in 1936 and contains Moore's Knob and other prominent peaks. From 1935 to 1942, the Civilian Conservation Corps, a New Deal agency, built a dam and  lake in the park, as well as hiking and climbing trails and picnic and campground areas.

Uniquely shaped Pilot Mountain is also located in the range.  Pilot Mountain State Park encompasses the westernmost end of the range. A hiking and bridle trail, known as the Sauratown Trail, crosses the range and interconnects the two state parks.  The Mountains-to-Sea Trail follows the Sauratown Trail and passes through both parks.

Peaks

References

Mountain ranges of North Carolina
Protected areas of Stokes County, North Carolina
Protected areas of Surry County, North Carolina
Inselbergs of Piedmont (United States)
Landforms of Stokes County, North Carolina
Landforms of Surry County, North Carolina